Treasured Earth (Hungarian: Talpalatnyi föld) is a 1948 Hungarian drama film directed by Frigyes Bán and starring Ági Mészáros, Ádám Szirtes and Tibor Molnár. It is based on a novel by Pál Szabó. It is also known by the alternative title The Soil Under Your Feet. István Szőts was originalled intended to be the director, but the film was taken away from him after his Song of the Cornfields was criticised by the country's Communist leadership. The film was chosen to be part of the Budapest Twelve, a list of Hungarian films considered the best in 1968.

Cast
 Ági Mészáros - Marika Juhos 
 Ádám Szirtes - Jóska Góz 
 Tibor Molnár - Jani Tarcali  
 Árpád Lehotay - Mihály Zsíros Tóth  
 Mariska Vízváry - aunt Zsíros 
 István Egri - Ferke Zsíros Tóth 
 László Bánhidi - András Szilasi

References

Bibliography
 Buranbaeva, Oksana & Mladineo, Vanja. Culture and Customs of Hungary. ABC-CLIO, 2011.
 Cunningham, John. Hungarian Cinema: From Coffee House to Multiplex. Wallflower Press, 2004.

External links

1948 films
Hungarian drama films
1940s Hungarian-language films
Films directed by Frigyes Bán
Films based on Hungarian novels
1948 drama films
Hungarian black-and-white films